Connecticut's 14th State Senate district elects one member to the Connecticut State Senate. It consists of the towns of Milford, Orange, and parts of West Haven and Woodbridge. It is currently represented by Democrat James Maroney.

Recent elections

2020

2018

2016

2014

2012

References

14